Each team's roster comprised a minimum of fifteen skaters (forwards and defencemen) and two goaltenders, and "due to the special situation with the COVID-19 pandemic and safety rules including no players being allowed to join late, the roster size for the tournament was exceptionally increased [from the standard 23] to 25 players." All ten participating nations, through the confirmation of their respective national associations, were required to submit a "Long List" roster no later than two weeks before the start of the tournament. Final rosters were submitted on 20 August 2021, one day before the tournament begins, but as no players can be added after arriving in Canada, rosters were effectively set when teams landed in Calgary on 11 August 2021.

Group A

Canada
Roster published 5 August 2021.

Head Coach: Troy Ryan

Finland
Roster published 3 August 2021.

Head coach: Pasi Mustonen

Russian Olympic Committee (ROC)
Roster published 10 August 2021.

Head coach: Yevgeni Bobariko

Switzerland
Roster published 9 August 2021.

Head coach: Colin Muller

United States
Roster published on 22 June 2021.

Head coach: Joel Johnson

Group B

Czech Republic
Roster published 9 August 2021.

Head coach: Tomáš Pacina

Denmark
Roster published 9 August 2021.

Head coach: Peter Elander

Germany
Roster published 10 August 2021.

Head Coach: Thomas Schädler

Hungary
Roster published 11 August 2021.

Head coach: Lisa Haley

Japan
Roster published August 2021.

Head Coach: Yuji Iizuka

References

External links
Official website

rosters
IIHF Women's World Championship rosters